The 1963–64 season was the 18th season in FK Partizan's existence. This article shows player statistics and matches that the club played during the 1963–64 season.

Players

Friendlies

Competitions

Yugoslav First League

Yugoslav Cup

European Cup

Preliminary round

First round

Quarter-finals

Statistics

Goalscorers 
This includes all competitive matches.

Score overview

See also
 List of FK Partizan seasons

References

External links
 Official website
 Partizanopedia 1963-64  (in Serbian)

FK Partizan seasons
Partizan
Partizan